The 1928 Tour de France was the 22nd edition of the Tour de France, one of cycling's Grand Tours. The Tour began in Paris with a team time trial on 17 June, and Stage 11 occurred on 30 June with a flat stage to Marseille. The race finished in Paris on 15 July.

Stage 1
17 June 1928 - Paris to Caen,  (TTT)

Stage 2
18 June 1928 - Caen to Cherbourg-en-Cotentin,  (TTT)

Stage 3
19 June 1928 - Cherbourg-en-Cotentin to Dinan,  (TTT)

Stage 4
20 June 1928 - Dinan to Brest,  (TTT)

Stage 5
21 June 1928 - Brest to Vannes,  (TTT)

Stage 6
22 June 1928 - Vannes to Les Sables d'Olonne,  (TTT)

Stage 7
23 June 1928 - Les Sables d'Olonne to Bordeaux,  (TTT)

Stage 8
24 June 1928 - Bordeaux to Hendaye,  (TTT)

Stage 9
26 June 1928 - Hendaye to Luchon,

Stage 10
28 June 1928 - Luchon to Perpignan,

Stage 11
30 June 1928 - Perpignan to Marseille,

References

1928 Tour de France
Tour de France stages